The "Westerwaldlied" is a German folk song, written by Willi Münker in 1932, set to music by Joseph Neuhäuser in 1935, and published in 1937. An ode to the Westerwald region of Western Germany, it has been performed by the German military for many decades.

History
 
The song's lyrics were written by Willi Münker in November 1932. It was set to music by Joseph Neuhäuser in 1935, reportedly based on an old folk song. It was published and recorded for the first time in 1937. It is an ode to the Westerwald region of Western Germany. It was sung by the German military during World War II.

The song for many decades was considered innocuous, enough to be performed by the contemporary German military. However, in recent years the performance of "Westerwaldlied" has become somewhat contentious and controversial in Germany due to its association with the Nazi era, with the German military reportedly ceasing performances of the song because of it in 2017. Defenders of the song maintain that it is an apolitical folk song with an established history of innocuous usage.

Usage elsewhere
A Spanish-language song based on the "Westerwaldlied"'s melody as composed by Neuhäuser is sung by the Chilean Army, where it is known as "Himno de la Sección". It is also the inspiration for the South Korean patriotic song "Our Nation Forever", used by the South Korean military. It appears in Rainer Werner Fassbinder's 1973 World on a Wire.

Lyrics

References

German military marches
German folk songs
Race-related controversies in music